Shaun the Sheep Movie is a 2015 British stop-motion animated adventure comedy film based on the Shaun the Sheep television series by Nick Park. It was written and directed by Mark Burton and Richard Starzak.

Shaun the Sheep Movie was well-received, with an approval rating of 99% on the review aggregator Rotten Tomatoes. The film was nominated for the Academy Award for Best Animated Feature at the 88th Academy Awards. It was also nominated for Five Annie Award nominations at 43rd Annie Awards, the most for the ceremony, including Outstanding Achievement in Directing in an Animated Feature Production for Burton and Starzak, Writing in an Animated Feature Production for Also Burton and Starzak and Best Animated Feature. The film won in the Toronto Film Critics Association Awards for Best Animated Feature. The film has also nominated for the Golden Globe Award for Best Animated Feature Film at 73rd Golden Globe Awards, 69th British Academy Film Awards and some many more awards.

Awards and nominations

Notes

References

External links
 

Shaun the Sheep
Shaun the Sheep films